100 Code (also known as The Hundred Code) is an internationally co-produced Swedish crime drama series, developed by Bobby Moresco, that first aired on German premium channel Sky Krimi on May 14, 2015. The series, which stars German-born British actor Dominic Monaghan and the late Swedish actor Michael Nyqvist, is based upon Ken Bruen's 2014 novel Merrick, and follows Tommy Conley (Monaghan), an NYPD detective who travels to Stockholm to advise and investigate a particularly gruesome series of murders.

The series was broadcast on Sky Atlantic in the United Kingdom, airing weekly from January 6, 2016. A DVD release of the complete series was released on October 30, 2015 in Germany, and on March 28, 2016 in the UK. The series premiered in the United States on WGN America on May 29, 2018.

Premise
Detective Tommy Conley travels to Stockholm to advise and investigate a particularly gruesome series of murders. Young, blonde, blue-eyed women are found murdered at regular intervals near water bodies and flower fields. Conley has to work with the Swedish investigator Mikael Eklund. The two hate each other, both fight with their own demons. After initial problems, the investigators investigate a series of murders, which, as initially thought, is not limited to New York and Stockholm, but has much larger dimensions.

Cast

Main
 Dominic Monaghan as Tommy Conley
 Michael Nyqvist as Mikael Eklund
 Felice Jankell as Hanna Eklund 
 Charlotta Jonsson as Karin Hammar 
 Danilo Bejarano as Björn Johnsson

Recurring
 Kristoffer Berglund as Phille 
 Peter Eggers as Göran 
 Hedda Stiernstedt as Josephine 
 Roisin Murphy as Maggie 
 Martin Wallström as Tomas 
 Christian Svensson as Andrej
 Patrick Brennan as The Dentist 
 Magnus Krepper as Henrik Renberg 
 Johanna Hedberg as Sandra Olsson 
 Aliette Opheim as Asha 
 Anna Åström as Frida
 Joe Pacheco as Frank Scarpetta

Episodes

References

External links

2015 Swedish television series debuts
2015 Swedish television series endings
2016 British television series debuts
2016 British television series endings
2010s British drama television series
Fictional portrayals of the New York City Police Department
Television shows based on Irish novels
Television shows set in New York City
Television shows set in Stockholm
Swedish crime television series
Swedish drama television series